The North Carolina General Assembly 2013–2014 session is the state legislature that first convened on January 9, 2013 and concluded (adjourned sine die) on August 20, 2014. Members of the North Carolina Senate and the North Carolina House of Representatives were elected on November 6, 2012, when the Republican Party increased the size of its majorities in both the North Carolina Senate and House of Representative to exceed the three-fifths number of elected members required for a super-majority.

House of Representatives
At the beginning of the session 2013-2014 session, the North Carolina House of Representatives consisted of 77 Republicans and 43 Democrats. Accounting for vacancies and appointments to date, as of January 12, 2014, there are 77 Republicans and 42 Democrats in office. As of January 12, 2014, there is one unfilled vacancy, created by the resignation of Rep. Deb McManus (D) on December 11, 2013. McManus represented the 54th House District, which includes all of Chatham County and parts of Lee County.

The 120 members of the House included 27 women, 22 African-Americans and one Native American.

House leadership

The following members were the leadership of the House of Representatives:

Senate
At the beginning of the session 2013-2014 session, the North Carolina Senate consisted of 33 Republicans and 17 Democrats. Accounting for vacancies and appointments to date, as of April 8, 2014, there are 33 Republicans and 15 Democrats in office. In December, there was one vacancy, created by the resignation of Sen. Peter S. Brunstetter (R) on December 15, 2013. Brunstetter represented the 31st Senate District, which consists of parts of Forsyth County and all of Yadkin County. The seat was filled by appointee Joyce Krawiec, former vice chairwoman of the state GOP. There is now a vacancy in the late Sen. Martin Nesbitt's (D) seat, 49th Senate District (Buncombe County), since his passing on March 6, 2014. Additionally, there is a vacancy for Dan Clodfelter's (D) seat after he resigned on April 8, 2014 due to be appointed Mayor of Charlotte by the City Council after the resignation of Patrick Cannon on 26 March 2014.

The Senate members included 10 women and 10 African-American members.

Senate leadership
Senate leadership included the following

References

External links
 (current session)
House 2013-2014 Session
Senate 2013-2014 Session

2013
General Assembly
General Assembly
 2013
 2013
2013 U.S. legislative sessions
2014 U.S. legislative sessions